Mark Anthony Manchin (born August 9, 1952) is an American educator and politician. He is a son of A. James Manchin and first cousin of Joe Manchin. He has served as the president of Glenville State College since 2020. He was previously a member of the West Virginia Senate.

References

1952 births
Living people
American people of Italian descent
Catholics from West Virginia
Fairmont State University alumni
Manchin family
West Virginia University alumni
20th-century American politicians
Democratic Party West Virginia state senators